Pult is a former municipality in the Shkodër County, northwestern Albania.

History 
At the 2015 local government reform it became a subdivision of the municipality Shkodër.
 
The population at the 2011 census was 1,529.

History 
It was the seat of a Latin Catholic Diocese of Pult (Latin name Pulati) since 900, until it was suppressed on 25 January 2005 by absorption into the Metropolitan Roman Catholic Archdiocese of Shkodrë–Pult, its title being incorporated therein.

References

Sources and external links
 GigaCatholic former diocese

Former municipalities in Shkodër County
Administrative units of Shkodër